Ranotsara Sud is a town in Atsimo-Atsinanana Region in south-eastern Madagascar.

References

Populated places in Atsimo-Atsinanana